Regions and provinces of Belgium may refer to:

Provinces of Belgium
Communities, regions and language areas of Belgium